The Old Bachelor's Dream is a 1913 Austro-Hungarian comedy film directed by Josef Kricenský. It was produced in 1910 and released on 7 February 1913.

Cast
 Josef Kricenský as Tobiás
 Ferry Seidl as Oskar
 Berta Friedrichová as Lilly
 Marie Demartiniová-Hradcanská as Landlady
 Otto Zahrádka as Forester
 Bohumil Kovár as Landlord

References

External links
 

1913 films
1913 comedy films
Austro-Hungarian films
Austrian black-and-white films
Hungarian black-and-white films
Czech black-and-white films
Austrian comedy films
Hungarian comedy films